The hairy saki (Pithecia hirsuta) is a species of saki monkey, a type of New World monkey. It is found in northern Peru, southern Colombia, and a small portion of northwestern Brazil.

Taxonomy 
It was described in 1823 by Johann Baptist von Spix, but was later merged with the monk saki (P. monachus). However, a 2014 study revived it as a distinct species based on differences in pelage coloration. The American Society of Mammalogists, IUCN Red List, and ITIS all follow this classification.

Distribution 
This species is found roughly at the intersection between Brazil, Peru, and Colombia, and ranges west of the Rio Negro, north of the Solimões River & Napo River, and south of the Japurá River. It is not known how far west it occurs, and where the boundary between this species and Miller's saki (P. milleri) is.

Description 
It can be considered the most uniform and plain of the sakis, with very little differences in coloration between males and females. Both are largely blackish agouti in coloration.

Status 
This species is thought to be threatened by logging & poaching and thus its population is thought to be declining. They are sometimes also found in the pet trade. However, this species remains poorly-known and it is thus classified as data deficient on the IUCN Red List.

References 

hairy saki
Mammals of Brazil
Mammals of Colombia
Mammals of Peru
Taxa named by Johann Baptist von Spix
hairy saki